Neosho Township is an inactive township in Newton County, in the U.S. state of Missouri.

Neosho Township took its name from the community of Neosho, Missouri. The unincorporated community of Tipton Ford is also in the township.

References

Townships in Missouri
Townships in Newton County, Missouri